Spring Arbor Township is a civil township of Jackson County in the U.S. state of Michigan.  The population was 8,267 at the 2010 census, up from 7,577 at the 2000 census.

Communities
Spring Arbor is an unincorporated community and census-designated place within the township.

Geography

Highway M-60 passes through the township, including the community of Spring Arbor, leading east to the western side of Jackson and west to Concord and Tekonsha. The west side of the township is part of the Kalamazoo River watershed, while the east side flows toward the Grand River. The North Branch of the Kalamazoo River passes through the southwest corner of the township.

Located west of the city of Jackson, it covers the entirety of the survey township of T3S R2W.

Demographics
As of the census of 2000, there were 7,577 people, 2,570 households, and 1,930 families residing in the township. The racial makeup of the township was 97.04% White, 0.81% African American, 0.40% Native American, 0.50% Asian, 0.13% Pacific Islander, 0.36% from other races, and 0.77% from two or more races. Hispanic or Latino of any race were 1.72% of the population.

There were 2,570 households, out of which 36.7% had children under the age of 18 living with them, 61.7% were married couples living together, 9.7% had a female householder with no husband present, and 24.9% were non-families. 21.1% of all households were made up of individuals, and 9.7% had someone living alone who was 65 years of age or older.  The average household size was 2.64 and the average family size was 3.05.

In the township the population was spread out, with 25.3% under the age of 18, 14.3% from 18 to 24, 25.2% from 25 to 44, 21.8% from 45 to 64, and 13.4% who were 65 years of age or older.  The median age was 35 years. For every 100 females, there were 91.6 males.  For every 100 females age 18 and over, there were 85.9 males.

The median income for a household in the township was $51,770, and the median income for a family was $59,407. Males had a median income of $42,245 versus $27,729 for females. The per capita income for the township was $19,622.  About 4.5% of families and 7.9% of the population were below the poverty line, including 8.9% of those under age 18 and 5.1% of those age 65 or over.

References

External links
Spring Arbor Township official website

Spring Arbor, Michigan
Townships in Jackson County, Michigan
Townships in Michigan
Populated places established in 1835
1835 establishments in Michigan Territory